SMS Lika was one of six s built for the  (Austro-Hungarian Navy) shortly before the First World War. Completed in August 1914, she helped to sink an Italian destroyer during the action off Vieste in May 1915 after Italy declared war on Austria-Hungary. Two months later the ship participated in an unsuccessful attempt to recapture a small island in the Central Adriatic Sea from the Italians. In November and early December Lika was one of the ships conducting raids off the Albanian coast to interdict the supply lines between Italy and Albania. The ship was sunk in Durazzo harbor during the early stages of the 1st Battle of Durazzo in late December after striking several mines.

Design and description
The Tátra-class destroyers were faster, more powerfully armed and more than twice as large as the preceding . The ships had a complement of 105 officers and enlisted men.

The Tátras were powered by two AEG-Curtiss steam turbine sets, each driving a single propeller shaft using steam provided by six Yarrow boilers. Four of the boilers were oil-fired while the remaining pair used coal.

The main armament of the Tátra-class destroyers consisted of two 50-caliber Škoda Works  K10 guns, one each fore and aft of the superstructure in single mounts. Their secondary armament consisted of six 45-caliber  guns, two of which were on anti-aircraft mountings. They were also equipped with four  torpedo tubes in two twin rotating mountings amidships.

Construction and career

Lika was laid down by Ganz-Danubius at their shipyard in Porto Ré in the Kingdom of Croatia-Slavonia of the Austro-Hungarian Empire on 30 April 1912, launched on 15 March 1913 and completed on 8 August 1914. The Tátra-class ships did not play a significant role in the minor raids and skirmishing in the Adriatic in 1914 and early 1915 between the Entente Cordiale and the Central Powers.

Action off Vieste

The Kingdom of Italy signed a secret treaty in London in late April 1915 breaking its alliance with the German Empire and Austro-Hungary and promising to declare war on the Central Powers within a month. Austro-Hungarian intelligence discovered this and Admiral Anton Haus, commander of the Austro-Hungarian Navy, planned a massive surprise attack on Italian ports and facilities on the Northern Adriatic coast, outside of interception range of the modern ships of the Royal Italian Navy stationed at Taranto. To warn of any Italian warships able to interfere with the bombardments, Haus prepositioned three groups of destroyers, each led by a scout cruiser. Placed in the Central Adriatic between the island of Pelagosa and the Italian coast, four days prior to the Italian declaration of war on 23 May, were four Tátra-class destroyers, including Lika, and the cruiser . Around midnight on the night of 23/24 May, Haus ordered the reconnaissance groups to move west and attack Italian coastal targets.

The Italian ships separated when Aquilone went to investigate a sighting; Helgoland began bombarding the city of Barletta at 04:00 and the Italian destroyer spotted the cruiser at 04:38. The ship turned away to the southeast and was able to disengage without any damage. Turbine, however, encountered Helgoland several minutes later and believed that she was an Italian ship until she was disabused by a salvo from the cruiser. The destroyer turned to the north, towards Vieste, to escape, with Helgoland and the destroyer  in pursuit. Lika, which had been bombarding Vieste, was ordered to block her escape to the north while Helgoland stayed to the east to cut off her access to the Adriatic. Lika scored the critical hit of the battle when one of her 66-millimeter shells broke Turbines steam pipe and caused her to rapidly lose speed. Tátra and Helgoland also scored hits and Turbine was dead in the water with a list when her crew abandoned ship at 06:51. She had hit Tátra and Csepel during the engagement, but failed to inflict any significant damage. The Austro-Hungarians rescued 35 survivors before torpedoing the derelict. As they were withdrawing they were engaged by the protected cruiser  and the armed merchant cruiser  between 07:10 and 07:19. Helgoland was struck by one shell before they were able to disengage from the slower ships.

On 28 July, all six Tátra-class ships and the scout cruisers  and Helgoland, reinforced by the German submarine , attempted to recapture Pelagosa which had been occupied by the Italians on 11 July. Despite a heavy bombardment by the ships, the 108-man landing party was unable to overcome the 90-man garrison and was forced to withdraw. Three weeks later, Saida, Helgoland, Lika, Orjen and two other destroyers bombarded the island, destroying its freshwater cistern, which forced the Italians to withdraw on 18 August.

The Bulgarian declaration of war on Serbia on 14 October cut the existing supply line from Serbia to Salonika, Greece, and forced the Allies to begin supplying Serbia through ports in Albania. This took about a month to work out the details and the Austro-Hungarians took just about as long to decide on a response. Haus ordered Seitz to take Helgoland, Saida and all six Tátra-class destroyers on a reconnaissance mission off the Albanian coast on the night of 22/23 November. They encountered and sank a small cargo ship and a motor schooner carrying flour for Serbia; four Italian destroyers were unable to intercept them before they reached friendly territory. On 6 December, Helgoland and the Tátras swept down the coast to Durazzo, sinking five motor schooners, including two in Durazzo harbor.

1st Battle of Durazzo

If they were not found he was to arrive at Durazzo at dawn and destroy any ships found there. He was unable to find the destroyers and dutifully arrived off Durazzo at dawn. At 07:30 he ordered four of his destroyers into the harbor to sink the cargo ship and two schooners anchored there while Helgoland engaged the coastal artillery defending the port. A well-camouflaged  artillery battery opened fire at 08:00 at point-blank range. While maneuvering to avoid its fire, Lika and Triglav entered a minefield. After striking two mines in quick succession, Lika sank at 08:03 and Triglav was crippled when her boiler rooms flooded after hitting one mine. Tátra rescued the ship's executive officer and 33 seamen after she sank.

Notes

Citations

Bibliography
 

 
 

Tátra-class destroyers
1913 ships